Thirumalai Thenkumari is a 1970 Indian Tamil-language road film written and directed by A. P. Nagarajan. Inspired by the 1969 film If It's Tuesday, This Must Be Belgium, it features an ensemble cast consisting of Sivakumar, Kumari Padmini, Rama Prabha, Shylashri, Manorama, Sirkazhi Govindarajan and Suruli Rajan. The film focuses on a group of passengers who embark on a pilgrimage across South India. It was released on 15 August 1970, emerged a commercial success, and won three Tamil Nadu State Film Awards.

Plot 

Ten to twelve families from different walks of life, different age groups and different languages unite for a pilgrimage, beginning with Tirupati and going as far as Kanyakumari.

Cast 
Actors
 Sivakumar as Sekhar
 Sirkazhi Govindarajan as Siva Chidambara Bhagvathar
 Suruli Rajan as Mannaru
 K. D. Santhanam as Chokkalingam
 Typist Gopu as Velu
 Gopalakrishnan as Prohit
 Master Prabhakar as Ramani
A. K. Veerasami
 A. Sasikumar as Mohan
 Chandran Babu as Kumar
 Haranath

Actresses
 Kumari Padmini as Geetha
 Rama Prabha as Saroja Mohan
A. Sakunthala as Lalitha
 Manorama as Muniyamma
 Gandhimathi as Ramani's grandmother
 Shylashri
 Vasantha
 Nalina
 Usharani
 P. Seethalakshmi as Rajeswari
S. N. Parvathy
 Nirmalamma

Production 
Thirumalai Thenkumari was among the earliest road films in Tamil cinema, and took inspiration from the 1969 film If It's Tuesday, This Must Be Belgium. Unlike the original, it was given a "religious twist", with its premise focusing on a group of passengers who embark on a pilgrimage across South India, visiting places like Tirupati and Madurai. The film was actually shot in the places depicted onscreen, as opposed to using sets. Since it was previously believed in the Tamil film industry that writer-director A. P. Nagarajan's films were successful only because of their star casts and "mammoth" scales, rather than his directorial skills, he made this film, which featured mostly newcomers, to silence his critics. Cinematography was handled by W. R. Subba Rao, the art direction by Ganga, and the editing by T. Vijayarangam. The film, which was produced by C. Paramasivan under the banner Sree Vijayalakshmi Pictures, was completed within a month.

Soundtrack 
The soundtrack of the film was composed by Kunnakudi Vaidyanathan. He based the song "Thirupathi Malaivaazhum" on the Suprabhatam. The song "Madhurai Arasaalum" is a ragamalika, i.e. set in multiple Carnatic ragas. "Thirupathi Malaivaazhum" and "Madhurai Arasaalum" were written by Ulundurpettai Shanmugam.

Release and reception 
Thirumalai Thenkumari was released on 15 August 1970. The film was a commercial success, and won in three categories at the Tamil Nadu State Film Awards: Best Music Director (Kunnakudi Vaidyanathan), Best Male Playback Singer (Sirkazhi Govindarajan), and a Special Prize. In 2016, film historian Randor Guy said the film would be remembered for "The music, and fine performances by veteran actors".

References

External links 
 

1970 films
1970s road movies
1970s Tamil-language films
Films about Hinduism
Films about vacationing
Films directed by A. P. Nagarajan
Films set in Bangalore
Films shot in Andhra Pradesh
Films shot in Kerala
Films shot in Madurai
Films shot in Mysore
Films with screenplays by A. P. Nagarajan
Hindu devotional films
Indian comedy road movies
Films scored by Kunnakudi Vaidyanathan